Ahmed Hassan or Ahmad Hassan may refer to: عراق عربي

Ahmad Hassan
Ahmad Hassan (Malaysian politician) (born 1960), Member of Parliament for Papar
Ahmad Hassan (Syrian politician) (born 1947), Syrian diplomat and information minister
Ahmed Hassan (terrorist),  (born c. 1999), author of Parsons Green train bombing

Ahmad al-Hassan
Ahmad al-Hassan (born 1968), leader of the Shia Iraqi movement Ansar of Imam al-Mahdi
Ahmad Y. al-Hassan (1925–2012), Palestinian/Syrian/Canadian historian

Ahmed Hassan
Ahmed Hassan (boxer) (born 1941), Egyptian Olympic boxer
Ahmed Hassan (cricketer) (born 1995), Italian cricketer of Pakistani descent
Ahmed Hassan (footballer, born 1975), Egyptian football midfielder
Ahmed Hassan (footballer, born 1993), Egyptian football striker
Ahmed Hassan (politician), Pakistani Senate politician
Ahmed Ismail Hassan (1990s–2012), Bahraini citizen journalist and videographer
Ahmed Issack Hassan (born 1970), Kenyan lawyer and politician
Ahmed M. Hassan, Somali American businessman and politician
Ahmed Mohamed Hassan (born 1945), Djiboutian politician
Ahmed Mohamed Hassan (pilot) (born 1953), Somali Air Force pilot
Ahmed Osman Hassan, Somali politician
Ahmed Salem Hassan, Egyptian cyclist at the 1924 Summer Olympics

Part of the name: Given and middle name 
Ahmad Hassan Abdullah (born 1981), long-distance and cross country runner who at first represented Kenya but then switched to Qatar
Ahmed Hassan al-Bakr (1914–1982), president of Iraq from 1968 to 1979
Ahmed Hassan Barata (born 1960), Nigerian politician
Ahmed Hassan Farag (born 1982), Egyptian football striker
Ahmed Hassan Mahmoud, Egyptian paralympic athlete 
Ahmed Hassan Mekky (born 1987), Egyptian football striker
Ahmed Hassan Musa (died 1979), Chadian insurgent
Ahmed Hassan Said (born 1961), Egyptian businessman and first chairman of the Free Egyptians Party
Ahmed Hassan Taleb (born 1980), Bahraini football midfielder